Wilbur P. (Wib) Gulley (born July 31, 1948) is an attorney and former state and local elected official from Durham, North Carolina.

Mayor
Gulley served as Mayor of Durham for two terms, from December 1985 to December 1989.  As Mayor, Gulley initiated Durham's affordable housing program, led neighborhood protection and center city revitalization efforts, and negotiated the City's acquisition of the local bus system from the Duke Power Company.

Gulley had won election in 1985 with 55% of the vote, was reelected in 1987 with 60% of the vote.  He did not run for reelection in 1989.

State Senator
First elected to the State Senate in November 1992, he began serving in January 1993 and served six (two year) terms in the North Carolina Senate. He represented constituents in Durham, Granville and Person counties. During his time in the state Senate, Gulley sponsored legislation that led to North Carolina's and the nation's first public financing of election campaigns for judicial office (for NC Supreme Court and NC Court of Appeals seats), as well as numerous campaign law reforms. He also led the Senate's Transportation Appropriations committee for five years, working to expand overall transportation funding with an emphasis on public transit and road maintenance.  Gulley also sponsored and led efforts to prohibit predatory lending in North Carolina, helping end "payday" lending in the state, as well as being the lead sponsor for several key environmental measures.

Triangle Transit
In March 2004, Gulley announced that his retirement from the General Assembly, effective 19 March 2004.  He went on to serve as the General Counsel for the Triangle Transit, the regional public transit agency.  In that capacity he is helping lead regional efforts to initiate passenger rail service and expanded transit options.  He retired from that position in 2014.

References

External links
 

|-

|-

North Carolina state senators
Mayors of Durham, North Carolina
Northwestern University Pritzker School of Law alumni
Living people
1948 births
21st-century American politicians